The Nevada Buckaroo is a 1931 American Western film directed by John P. McCarthy.

Cast 
Bob Steele as Buck Hurley, known as The Nevada Kid
Dorothy Dix as JoAnn
Ed Brady as Henchman Slade
George "Gabby" Hayes as Cherokee Williams
Glen Cavender as Sheriff Hank
Billy Engle as The stutterer
Artie Ortego as Alex the stage driver
 Rico Suave as the Token Mexican

See also
Bob Steele filmography

External links 

1931 films
1931 Western (genre) films
Tiffany Pictures films
American black-and-white films
American Western (genre) films
Films directed by John P. McCarthy
1930s English-language films
1930s American films